The 1990–91 Ranji Trophy was the 57th season of the Ranji Trophy cricket tournament. Haryana defeated Bombay by 2 runs in the closest Ranji final in history.

Group stage

North Zone

Central Zone

East Zone

South Zone

West Zone

Knockout stage 
{{Round16

| seed-width  = 25px
| team-width  = 150px
| score-width = 100px

|||||
|2 Feb 1991 — Indore|Madhya Pradesh|377 & 165|Bombay|493 & 50/0
|||||
|||||
|||||
|2 Feb 1991 — Pune|Maharashtra|311 & 268/2|Karnataka (F)''|638 & 307/2d|||||
|||||

|16 Apr 1991 — Delhi|Delhi|389 & 371/4|Bombay (F)|390 & 719/8d|16 Apr 1991 — Ranchi|Bihar|203|Hyderabad (F)|298/6|16 Apr 1991 — Calcutta|Bengal (R)|652/9|Karnataka|791/6d
|16 Apr 1991 — Faridabad|Haryana (F)|339 & 429/9d|Uttar Pradesh|295 & 221/7

|24 Apr 1991 — Bombay|Bombay (F)|855/6d & 446/4d|Hyderabad|498 & 36/0
|24 Apr 1991 — Calcutta|Bengal|440|Haryana (F)|605 & 274/5|3 May 1991 — Bombay|Bombay|410 & 352|Haryana|522 & 242|skipmatch01=yes|skipmatch02=no|skipmatch03=yes|skipmatch04=yes|skipmatch05=yes|skipmatch06=no|skipmatch07=yes|skipmatch08=yes
|RD1 = Pre-Quarter-finals|RD2 = Quarter-finals|RD3 = Semi-finals|RD4 = Finals
|3rdplace=no}}(F) - Advanced to next round on First Innings Lead.(R)''' - Advanced to next round on better Run Rate.

Final

Scorecards and averages
Cricketarchive

References

External links

1991 in Indian cricket
Ranji Trophy seasons
Domestic cricket competitions in 1990–91